Viburnum erubescens, the reddish viburnum, is a species of flowering plant in the family Viburnaceae. It is native to Sri Lanka, India, Nepal, Bangladesh, China, Myanmar, and Vietnam. It is a deciduous shrub that grows in forests and scrub. Flowers are fragrant and bloom April to June. The unimproved species is available from commercial suppliers, as is a putative variety, Viburnum erubescens var. gracilipes, the slender blushing viburnum, and a number of cultivars, including 'Foster', 'Lloyd Kenyon', 'Milke Danda', and 'Ward van Teylingen'.

References

erubescens
Ornamental plants
Garden plants of Asia
Flora of Sri Lanka
Flora of India (region)
Flora of East Himalaya
Flora of Nepal
Flora of West Himalaya
Flora of Tibet
Flora of North-Central China
Flora of South-Central China
Flora of Bangladesh
Flora of Myanmar
Flora of Vietnam
Plants described in 1830